Barnes-Jewish Hospital  is the largest hospital in the U.S. state of Missouri. Located in the Central West End neighborhood of St. Louis, it is the adult teaching hospital for the Washington University School of Medicine and a major component of the Washington University Medical Center. In 2022, Barnes-Jewish was named one of the top twenty hospitals in the United States by U.S. News & World Report in its annual ranking.

Capacity
Barnes-Jewish Hospital is a member of BJC HealthCare and is located on the campus of the Washington University Medical Center. Barnes-Jewish is the largest private employer in Greater St. Louis, employing 10,125 people, including 1,723 attending physicians, in 2018. It is responsible for the education of 1,129 interns, residents, and fellows.

As of 2018, the hospital had 1,266 beds with a staff of 12,125.

History 
Barnes-Jewish was formed by the merger of two hospitals, Barnes Hospital and The Jewish Hospital of St. Louis. Each hospital was built in the early 1900s in proximity to each other on the eastern edge of Forest Park. Although the hospitals were initially linked by an affiliation agreement in 1993, the two were legally merged in 1996.

Barnes Hospital was founded at the bequest of wholesale grocer and banker, Robert Barnes, who died in 1892. In coordination between Barnes executors and St. Louis philanthropist Robert Brookings, the hospital was intended as an affiliate for the Washington University School of Medicine. Barnes hospital opened on December 7, 1914, at its current location on Kingshighway Boulevard. The hospital was designed by architect, Theodore Link, and initially had a 373-bed capacity. It was at this time that the St. Louis Children's Hospital, and in 1915 the reorganized school of medicine, were relocated adjacent to Barnes Hospital.

Jewish Hospital was founded in 1902 by leaders of the St. Louis Jewish community in order to care for "the sick and disabled of, 'any creed or nationality.'" The hospital was originally located on 5414 Delmar Boulevard. Due to the increasing number of patients and need for expansion, the hospital was relocated two blocks north of the Barnes Hospital/Washington University Medical School complex in 1926.

Heliport

The heliport is available for emergency air ambulance service.

Rankings and achievements 
Barnes-Jewish Hospital has been named on U.S. News & World Report's Honor Roll of America's best hospitals several times. Barnes-Jewish is home to multiple specialties ranked among the best nationally including cancer; digestive disorders; ear, nose and throat; and urology. In 2016, Barnes-Jewish Hospital received a two star rating from medicare hospital quality rankings.

Becker's Hospital Review recognized Barnes-Jewish Hospital as one of 100 Great Hospitals in March 2012 and 2014, 100 Hospitals With Great Heart Programs in January 2013, and 100 Hospitals and Health Systems With Great Oncology Programs, along with the affiliated Alvin J. Siteman Cancer Center, in February 2013.

References

External links
 Barnes-Jewish Hospital website
  BJC HealthCare
 Alvin J. Siteman Cancer Center
 Washington University Orthopedics

Hospital buildings completed in 1914
Hospital buildings completed in 1927
Teaching hospitals in Missouri
Hospitals in St. Louis
Hospitals established in 1914
Washington University in St. Louis
Jewish medical organizations
Jews and Judaism in St. Louis
Hospitals in Missouri
Skyscrapers in St. Louis
Skyscrapers in Missouri
Central West End, St. Louis
Buildings and structures in St. Louis
1927 establishments in Missouri
Trauma centers